Franciszek Pius Radziwiłł (1 February 1878, in Rome – 1 December 1944) was a Polish noble (prince) and political activist. Director of the Military Commission in the Provisional Council of State (1917) and in the government of Jan Kanty Steczkowski in 1918.

1878 births
1944 deaths
Franciszek Pius
Members of the Provisional Council of State
Polish anti-communists